KVDW (branded as Vern 1530AM) is a radio station serving the Little Rock metropolitan area with southern gospel and talk programming. 

The station broadcasts on AM frequency 1530 kHz and is currently owned by Alvin Simmons, through licensee Habibi's Broadcasting, Inc.

Because it shares the same frequency as "clear channel" station WCKY-AM in Cincinnati, Ohio; KVDW operates only during daytime hours.

History
KVDW began its broadcasting activities on December 18, 2006, and has since then maintained its current format. It was formerly known as "Victory 1530."

FM Translator
In addition to the main station at 1530 kHz, KVDW is relayed by an FM translator in order to widen its broadcast area and provide 24 hours coverage.

External links
Vern 1530AM - Official Site

VDW
VDW
Mass media in Little Rock, Arkansas
1976 establishments in Arkansas
Radio stations established in 1976
Southern Gospel radio stations in the United States